Avan is a rural locality (a village) in Vyazemsky District, Khabarovsk Krai, Russia. The population was 714 . There are 13 streets.

Geography 
Avan is located 11 km southwest of Vyazemsky (the district's administrative centre) by road. Otradnoye is the nearest rural locality.

References 

Rural localities in Khabarovsk Krai